The 2014 United States Senate special election in Oklahoma took place on November 4, 2014, to elect a member of the United States Senate to represent the State of Oklahoma, concurrently with the regularly-scheduled election to Oklahoma's other Senate seat, as well as other elections to the United States Senate in other states and elections to the United States House of Representatives and various state and local elections.

This special election was held to fill the remaining two years of incumbent Republican Senator Tom Coburn's second term. Coburn, a strong supporter of term limits, had announced even before he was elected to the Senate in 2004 that he would only serve for two terms. After he was re-elected in 2010, he reaffirmed that he would not run for re-election in 2016.

In January 2014, Coburn announced he would resign early at the end of the 113th United States Congress on January 3, 2015. As pursuant to Oklahoma law, he submitted an "irrevocable letter of resignation" to take effect on that day. Thus, the special election was held while he was still in office.

Unlike most states, except in very specific circumstances, Oklahoma Governor Mary Fallin did not have the power to appoint a replacement senator. Instead, state law required her to schedule the special election "as soon as practicable".

Primary elections were held on June 24, 2014. The Republicans nominated U.S. Representative James Lankford; as no candidate in the Democratic primary received more than 50% of the vote, a primary runoff election was held on August 26 between State Senator Connie Johnson and perennial candidate Jim Rogers, which Johnson won. In the general election, Lankford defeated Johnson in a landslide and was sworn in on the day Coburn's resignation took effect. Lankford easily won re-election to a full six-year term in 2016.

Republican primary 
By April 2014, Lankford and T.W. Shannon were seen as the main contenders for the Republican nomination, with Brogdon a potential spoiler who was running even further to the right than they did. Although there was reported to be "little daylight ideologically" between Lankford and Shannon, and both are associated with the Tea Party movement, Shannon attracted the support of figures including Ted Cruz, Mike Lee and Sarah Palin and organizations including FreedomWorks and the Senate Conservatives Fund. They criticized Lankford for his votes to raise the debt ceiling and for being a member of the Republican House leadership. Supporters of Lankford, including the chairman of the Oklahoma Republican Party, pointed out Shannon's ties to the establishment-supporting Congressman Tom Cole, accused Cruz, Lee, Palin and the others of being "outsiders" who were attempting to meddle in the state's primary, and also pointed out that the aforementioned had previously criticized Coburn, whom they were now praising in an attempt to woo him into supporting Shannon. Local Tea Party groups also criticised the national conservatives, saying in an open letter that they had endorsed Shannon without consulting them or examining his record, that Shannon was a "poser" who "had never stepped foot" in a Tea Party meeting before announcing his run for the Senate and "no longer attends grassroots meetings nor does he seek the grassroots support".

In June, Coburn responded to attack ads calling Lankford a "Washington insider" who "votes with liberals" by saying that "political advertisements by groups... supporting T.W. Shannon have crossed an important line — they simply aren't truthful and they mischaracterize James Lankford's service in Congress." He also called Lankford "a man of absolute integrity" who was "one of the most honest, thoughtful and sincere men I have met in my time in Washington." He also praised Lankford's "life experience", "perspective" and willingness to fight the "status quo", but stopped short of fully endorsing him. He did however say that "as a voter", the negative ads from pro-Shannon groups made him question Shannon's ability to govern.

By mid-June, Lankford was considered to have the momentum, a reversal of fortunes, though a runoff was considered likely. Shannon's negative advertisements were considered to have backfired, in contrast to Lankford's advertisements, which were largely positive. Lankford also raised and spent more money than Shannon, who was not significantly helped financially by national conservative groups, who had focused their attention on the primary runoff in Mississippi between incumbent senator Thad Cochran and conservative challenger Chris McDaniel. The runoff in Mississippi was held on the same day as the primary in Oklahoma and Alexandra Jaffe of The Hill reported that Shannon's best hope was to force a runoff, which would allow the national groups to refocus on Oklahoma. Outside spending for Shannon was $1.8m compared to $170,000 for Lankford but Lankford spent $1.8m to Shannon's $1.1m.

In what was considered a surprise result, Lankford defeated Shannon by over 20%, negating the need for a runoff. Lankford ran a strong, well-organised campaign, considered by Congressman Tom Cole to be "probably the best organization in the state that was operating at this time". He was also helped by his "existing statewide presence grounded in the state's burgeoning Baptist community", which goes back to his time before politics when he ran the Falls Creek Baptist Youth Camp, and the fact that his congressional district is based in Oklahoma City, where turnout was predicted to be high because there was also a competitive race in the Republican primary to succeed him. To attempt to counteract that, Shannon targeted the media market in Tulsa. Finally, unlike in other races, there was no split between the establishment and the Tea Party, with Shannon not capitalising on an "anti-establishment" wave that benefited others like Ben Sasse in Nebraska. Cole summarised: "We don't need people coming in and telling us who conservatives are, [because] everybody is a conservative. There are no moderates." State Senator David Holt, who supported Shannon, said that Coburn's comments about Lankford were the most important factor, saying that "Senator Coburn is enormously respected in Oklahoma, and when it appeared that he had a preference, I think that the voters listened."

Candidates

Declared 
 Randy Brogdon, former state senator and candidate for Governor in 2010
 Andy Craig, Army Veteran and sales professional
 Kevin Crow, college professor
 James Lankford, U.S. Representative
 Eric McCray, businessman
 T. W. Shannon, state representative and former Speaker of the Oklahoma House of Representatives
 Jason Weger, paramedic

Declined 
 Jim Bridenstine, U.S. Representative
 Tom Cole, U.S. Representative
 Patrice Douglas, State Corporation Commissioner and former mayor of Edmond (running for OK-05)
 Mary Fallin, Governor of Oklahoma
 Frank Keating, former governor of Oklahoma
 Todd Lamb, Lieutenant Governor of Oklahoma
 Frank Lucas, U.S. Representative
 Markwayne Mullin, U.S. Representative
 Scott Pruitt, Attorney General of Oklahoma
 J. C. Watts, former U.S. Representative

Endorsements

Polling 

 * Internal poll for James Lankford campaign

Results

Democratic primary

Candidates

Declared 
 Patrick Hayes
 Connie Johnson, state senator
 Jim Rogers, perennial candidate and nominee for the U.S. Senate in 2010

Withdrew 
 Charles Jenkins, retired federal employee

Declined 
 Bill Anoatubby, Governor of the Chickasaw Nation
 Jari Askins, former lieutenant governor of Oklahoma and nominee for governor in 2010
 Dan Boren, former U.S. Representative
 Clark Brewster, attorney
 Kenneth Corn, former state senator and nominee for lieutenant governor in 2010
 Drew Edmondson, former attorney general of Oklahoma and candidate for governor in 2010
 Kathy Taylor, former mayor of Tulsa

Endorsements

Polling

Results

Runoff

Independents

Candidates

Declared 
 Mark Beard

General election

Debates 
 Complete video of debate, October 7, 2014

Predictions

Polling

Results

See also 

 2014 United States Senate elections
 2014 United States elections
 2014 United States Senate election in Oklahoma
 2014 United States House of Representatives elections in Oklahoma
 2014 Oklahoma gubernatorial election

Notes

References

External links 
 
Official campaign websites (Archived)
 James Lankford for U.S. Senate
 Connie Johnson for U.S. Senate
 Andy Craig for U.S. Senate
 Kevin Crow for U.S. Senate
 Eric McCray for U.S. Senate
 T.W. Shannon for U.S. Senate
 Jason Weger for U.S. Senate

2014 special
Oklahoma special
United States Senate special
Oklahoma 2014
United States Senate 2014
Oklahoma Senate 2014